Tell Me It's Over may refer to:

 "Tell Me It's Over" (Avril Lavigne song), 2018
 "Tell Me It's Over" (Frida song), 1983